Muradbəyli (also, Muradbeyli) is a village and municipality in the Sabirabad Rayon of Azerbaijan.  It has a population of 574.

References 

Populated places in Sabirabad District